John Nderitu is a Kenyan politician. He is the current senator for Laikipia County.

Education 
Nderitu went to Kiamariga Primary School for his KCPE and Gatero Secondary School. He furthered his education at University of Nairobi where he acquired a BSC,Chemistry and Botany.

Career 
Nderitu  was employed in Microlabs Pharmaceutical Company as a Medical Representatives. In 2007 he quit medical representative job for other roles in politics, he was Laikipia county Councilor.

References 

Living people
Members of the Senate of Kenya
Year of birth missing (living people)